Notes on Blindness is a 2016 British documentary film directed by Peter Middleton and James Spinney. The film profiles writer and theologian John M. Hull, who became totally blind after decades of steadily deteriorating vision. To help him make sense of the upheaval in his life, Hull began documenting his experiences on audio cassette and wrote his autobiography Touching the Rock: An Experience of Blindness in 1990.

The film won the British Independent Film Award for Best Documentary and received nominations for Best Director, Breakthrough Producer, Best Achievement in Craft (Joakim Sundström for sound) and the Douglas Hickox Award. At the 70th British Academy Film Awards, the film was nominated for Best British Film, Best Documentary and Outstanding Debut by a British Writer, Director or Producer. It was pitched at Sheffield Doc/Fest's 2012 MeetMarket.

Dan Renton Skinner and Simone Kirby depict John Hull and Marilyn Hull respectively in the film.

"Notes on Blindness: Into Darkness" won a XR Peabody Award in 2021.

References

External links
  – official site
 
 

2016 films
2016 documentary films
British documentary films
Documentary films about blind people
2010s English-language films
2010s British films
Films about disability